In algebra, a resolvent cubic is one of several distinct, although related, cubic polynomials defined from a monic polynomial of degree four:

In each case:
 The coefficients of the resolvent cubic can be obtained from the coefficients of  using only sums, subtractions and multiplications.
Hence the name “resolvent cubic”.
 The polynomial  has a multiple root if and only if its resolvent cubic has a multiple root.

Definitions
Suppose that the coefficients of  belong to a field  whose characteristic is different from . If  is the field  of rational numbers, then  can be the field  of complex numbers or the field  of algebraic numbers.

In some cases, the concept of resolvent cubic is defined only when  is a quartic in depressed form—that is, when .

First definition
Suppose that  is a depressed quartic—that is, that .

To be more precise:

Now you have:

If this expression is a square, it can only be the square of

But the equality

is equivalent to

and this is the same thing as the assertion that  = 0.

together with the roots of the polynomial

Second definition
Another possible definition (still supposing that  is a depressed quartic) is

The origin of this definition is similar to the previous one. This time, we start by doing:

and a computation similar to the previous one shows that this last expression is a square if and only if

A simple computation shows that

Third definition
Another possible definition (again, supposing that  is a depressed quartic) is

The origin of this definition lies in another method of solving quartic equations, namely Descartes' method.

It is a consequence of the first two equations that then

and

Note that

Fourth definition
Still another possible definition is

a fact the follows from Vieta's formulas. In other words, R4(y) is the monic polynomial whose roots are 
, 
, and 
.

It is easy to see that

Therefore,  has a multiple root if and only if  has a multiple root. More precisely,  and  have the same discriminant.

One should note that if  is a depressed polynomial, then

Fifth definition
Yet another definition is

again as a consequence of Vieta's formulas. In other words,  is the monic polynomial whose roots are 
,
, and 
.

It is easy to see that

More precisely,  and  have the same discriminant. This is also a consequence of the fact that  = .

Note that if  is a depressed polynomial, then

Applications

Solving quartic equations
In the general case, one simply has to find the roots of the depressed polynomial . For each root  of this polynomial,  is a root of .

Factoring quartic polynomials
This second possibility occurs if and only if  has a root in . In order to determine whether or not  can be expressed as the product of two quadratic polynomials, let us assume, for simplicity, that  is a depressed polynomial.

Let  be such a polynomial. We can assume without loss of generality that  is monic. We can also assume without loss of generality that it is a reduced polynomial, because  can be expressed as the product of two quadratic polynomials if and only if  can and this polynomial is a reduced one. Then  = . There are two cases:
 If  then  = . So, we can take  = .
 If  = , then  = . The roots of this polynomial are  and the roots of the quadratic polynomial . If , then the product of the two roots of this polynomial is smaller than  and therefore it has a root greater than  (which happens to be ) and we can take  as the square root of that root. Otherwise,  and then,

Indeed, this statement can be expressed in first-order logic and any such statement that holds for  also holds for any real closed field.

A similar approach can be used to get an algorithm to determine whether or not a quartic polynomial  is reducible and, if it is, how to express it as a product of polynomials of smaller degree. Again, we will suppose that  is monic and depressed. Then  is reducible if and only if at least one of the following conditions holds:
 The polynomial  has a rational root (this can be determined using the rational root theorem).
 The resolvent cubic  has a root of the form , for some non-null rational number  (again, this can be determined using the rational root theorem).
 The number  is the square of a rational number and  = .
Indeed:
 Finally, if the third condition holds and if  is such that =, then  = .

Galois groups of irreducible quartic polynomials
Then the group  is a subgroup of the symmetric group . More precisely:
 If  (that is, if the resolvent cubic factors into linear factors in ), then  is the group }.
 If  (that is, if the resolvent cubic has one and, up to multiplicity, only one root in ), then, in order to determine , one can determine whether or not  is still irreducible after adjoining to the field  the roots of the resolvent cubic. If not, then  is a cyclic group of order 4; more precisely, it is one of the three cyclic subgroups of  generated by any of its six -cycles. If it is still irreducible, then  is one of the three subgroups of  of order , each of which is isomorphic to the dihedral group of order .
 If , then  is the alternating group .
 If , then  is the whole group .

See also
Resolvent (Galois theory)

References
 

Algebra
Equations
Polynomials